Frederick Augustus Muhlenberg (1818–1901) was an American educator and Lutheran clergyman who served as president of Muhlenberg College in Allentown, Pennsylvania and as a Greek language and literature professor at the University of Pennsylvania in Philadelphia.

Family
Muhlenberg was born to German Americans Frederick Augustus Hall Muhlenberg (1795–1867) and his wife Elizabeth Schaum in Lancaster, Pennsylvania on August 25, 1818. Frederick A. Hall Muhlenberg was the son of Gotthilf Henry Ernst Muhlenberg a noted botanist.  Muhlenberg was born at Lancaster, Pennsylvania where his father was a physician and a trustee of Frankin College.  F. A. H. Muhlenberg had received his M.D. from the University of Pennsylvania where Benjamin Rush had been among his teachers.

In 1848, Muhlenberg married Catherine Anne Muhlenberg.  She was a granddaughter of Gotthilf Muhlenberg's brother Peter Muhlenberg, and thus a second-cousin of Frederick.  They were the parents of six sons.

Education and career
Frederick Augustus Muhlenberg began his education at Pennsylvania College (now Gettysburg College) and then transferred to Jefferson College (now Washington and Jefferson College) from which he graduated in 1836.  He then studies at Princeton Theological Seminary.  In 1840 Muhlenberg joined the faculty of Franklin College (now Franklin & Marshall College).

In 1850, Muhlenberg joined the faculty of Pennsylvania College, where he taught Greek and served as college Librarian.  In 1854 he was ordained a Lutheran minister, and actively served as such in various Lutheran Churches in and around Gettysburg.  He remained at Pennsylvania College until 1867.

From 1867 to 1876, Muhlenberg served as president of Muhlenberg College. In 1876, Muhlenberg was appointed a professor of Greek at the University of Pennsylvania, where he remained until 1888.

He was elected as a member to the American Philosophical Society in 1878.

In 1891, Muhlenberg became the president of Thiel College.  However, in 1893 a stroke forced him to resign that position.  He lived in Reading, Pennsylvania from 1893 until his death on March 21, 1901.

References

External links

1818 births
People from Reading, Pennsylvania
Gettysburg College alumni
Washington & Jefferson College alumni
Princeton Theological Seminary alumni
Franklin & Marshall College faculty
19th-century American Lutheran clergy
Muhlenberg College faculty
American people of German descent
Muhlenberg family
University of Pennsylvania faculty
Thiel College
1901 deaths